St Stephen's Church is a redundant Anglican church on Brunel Terrace, Low Elswick, Newcastle upon Tyne, England.  It is recorded in the National Heritage List for England as a designated Grade II listed building, and is under the care of the Churches Conservation Trust.

History

The foundation stone of the church was laid by Sir William Armstrong on 19 November 1866.  Building was completed in 1868 and it was dedicated by Charles Baring, Bishop of Durham, during that year.  It was declared redundant on 1 January 1984 and was vested in the Trust on 18 March 1987.  Only the base of the tower is available for public access.

Architecture

The church is constructed in sandstone with a Welsh slate roof.  As built, its plan consisted of a nave with north and south aisles and a west porch, a north transept, a chancel with a north aisle, and a northwest tower.  Its architectural style is Decorated Gothic Revival.  The tower is in three stages with triple bell openings, a corbel table, and a battlemented parapet.  Flying buttresses lead up to a tall octagonal spire with lucarnes.  It contains a ring of eight bells which were cast in 1880 by John Taylor of Loughborough.

See also
List of churches preserved by the Churches Conservation Trust in Northern England

References

Churches in Newcastle upon Tyne
Grade II listed churches in Tyne and Wear
Gothic Revival church buildings in England
Gothic Revival architecture in Tyne and Wear
Churches completed in 1868
19th-century Church of England church buildings
Churches preserved by the Churches Conservation Trust
Former Church of England church buildings
Diocese of Newcastle